Montirat may refer to the following places in France:

 Montirat, Aude, a commune in the Aude department
 Montirat, Tarn, a commune in the Tarn department